Peter Deyo (born September 29, 1957) is an American sprint canoer who competed in the late 1970s. At the 1976 Summer Olympics in Montreal, he was eliminated in the semifinals of K-2 1000 m event and the repechages of the K-4 1000 m event.

References
Sports-reference.com profile

1957 births
American male canoeists
Canoeists at the 1976 Summer Olympics
Living people
Olympic canoeists of the United States